Kadino is a village in the municipality of Ilinden, North Macedonia.

Demographics
As of the 2021 census, Kadino had 2,340 residents with the following ethnic composition:
Macedonians 2,088
Persons for whom data are taken from administrative sources 119
Serbs 81
Albanians 29
Others 15
Roma 8

According to the 2002 census, the village had a total of 2,340 inhabitants. Ethnic groups in the village include:
Macedonians 2,088
Serbs 140
Turks 13
Romani 11
Others 70

Sports
Local football club FK Kadino play in the Macedonian Second League (West Division).

References

External links

Villages in Ilinden Municipality